Benjamin Ernest "Ben" Linder (July 7, 1959 – April 28, 1987), was an American engineer. While working on a small hydroelectric dam in rural northern Nicaragua, Linder was killed by the Contras, a loose confederation of rebel groups funded by the U.S. government. Coming at a time when U.S. support for the Contras was already highly controversial, Linder's death made front-page headlines around the world and further polarized opinion in the United States.

Biography
The California-born Linder was raised in a secular Jewish family in San Francisco and later Portland, Oregon. He graduated from Adams High School in Portland, Oregon in 1977. While in college at the University of Washington, Linder enjoyed juggling and was often seen around Seattle riding a  unicycle. He graduated in 1983, with a degree in mechanical engineering. He left his Oregon home that summer and moved to Managua, the capital of Nicaragua.

Linder felt inspired by the 1979 Sandinista revolution, and wanted to support its efforts to improve the lives of the country's poorest people. The Reagan administration, however, was determined to cripple the revolution. Beginning in 1981, the Central Intelligence Agency secretly trained, armed and supplied thousands of Contra rebels. A major element of the Contras' strategy was to launch attacks on government cooperatives, health clinics and power stations—the things that most exemplified the improvements that had been brought about by the revolution.

In 1986, Linder moved from Managua to El Cuá, a village in the Nicaraguan war zone, where he helped form a team to build a hydroelectric plant to bring electricity to the town. While living in El Cuá, he participated in vaccination campaigns, using his talents as a clown, juggler, and unicyclist to entertain the local children, for whom he expressed great affection and concern.

On 28 April 1987, Linder and two Nicaraguans were killed in a Contra ambush while traveling through the forest to scout out a construction site for a new dam for the nearby village of San José de Bocay. The autopsy showed that Linder had been wounded by a grenade, then shot at point-blank range in the head. The two Nicaraguans—Sergio Hernández and Pablo Rosales—were also killed at close range. Linder was posthumously awarded the Courage of Conscience award on September 26, 1992.

Controversy
Linder's death quickly inflamed the already-polarized debate inside the United States, with opponents of U.S. policy decrying the use of taxpayers' dollars to finance the killing of an American citizen as well as thousands of Nicaraguan civilians.

The administration fought back, with White House spokesman Marlin Fitzwater quoted in The New York Times as saying that U.S. citizens working in Nicaragua had "put themselves in harm's way". Assistant Secretary of State Elliott Abrams, an ardent proponent of the Contra War, echoed that view, saying that Linder should have known better than to be in a combat zone.

Linder's mother Elisabeth, in Nicaragua for her son's funeral, said, 
My son was brutally murdered for bringing electricity to a few poor people in northern Nicaragua. He was murdered because he had a dream and because he had the courage to make that dream come true. ... Ben told me the first year that he was here, and this is a quote, "It's a wonderful feeling to work in a country where the government's first concern is for its people, for all of its people."

During a Congressional hearing in May 1987, some defenders of U.S. policy in Nicaragua responded, launching personal attacks on Linder's family and other witnesses. The Village Voice reported one exchange between Republican Congressman Connie Mack of Florida and Elisabeth Linder, who had just given emotional testimony about her son's work and motivations. Mack accused Mrs. Linder of using her grief "to politicize this situation", adding, "I don't want to be tough on you, but I really feel you have asked for it."

The death of Linder, coming as Congressional hearings investigated the Iran-Contra Affair, fueled the debate in the U.S. over the covert war in Nicaragua. The next year, Congress refused to renew aid to the Contras. But the civil war, conscription into the army, the collapse of the economy, and the curtailment of civil liberties in the mid-1980s all combined to cause the defeat of the FSLN government in February 1990 elections.

In July 1996, American journalist Paul Berman published an article in The New Yorker featuring an interview with a man who claimed to have killed Linder. Linder's parents and their lawyers publicly denounced the article and disputed the veracity of the man Berman interviewed. In 2001 journalist Joan Kruckewitt, who lived in Nicaragua from 1983 to 1991 and covered the war between the Sandinistas and the Contras for ABC Radio, wrote a book entitled The Death of Ben Linder giving a more sympathetic portrait of Linder's life, work, and death.

The song "Fragile" on Sting's 1987 album, ...Nothing Like the Sun, is a tribute to Ben Linder.  In 1989 American artist Mike Alewitz painted a mural in Linder's memory in Esteli, Nicaragua. Singer-songwriter Dean Stevens wrote and recorded "The Children Knew Ben" on his 1989 CD, Seeds, for Volcano Records. The 1990 book Animal Dreams by Barbara Kingsolver is also dedicated to his memory, as was the (now closed) Ben Linder Cafe in Leon, Nicaragua, which was adorned with his photo and memories of his life's work. A week after Ben's death a group of Jugglers for Peace toured Nicaragua performing shows in Schools, military camps, co-operatives, villages and on the streets celebrating his life and work. They were invited to join in a peace march with other activists to the town where he worked and made a video documentary. https://www.youtube.com/watch?v=PYzKfn7ZwkU&t=1243s

See also
Witness for Peace
Bill Stewart, an ABC reporter killed along with his interpreter in Managua in 1979.
Brian Willson, an American injured by a naval munitions train while protesting US arms shipments to Central America.

Footnotes

Further reading

 Héctor Perla, Jr., "Heirs of Sandino: The Nicaraguan Revolution and the U.S.-Nicaragua Solidarity Movement," Latin American Perspectives, vol. 36, no. 6 (Nov. 2009), pp. 80–100. In JSTOR

External links
 Remembering Benjamin Linder by Jeffrey McCrary
 The Death of a Dreamer, from the Religious Task Force on Central America and Mexico
 Publisher's webpage for The Death of Ben Linder, by Joan Kruckewitt 
 The Death of Ben Linder (excerpt)
 Ben Linder explains the functions of the small scale hydro-electric facility in El Cuá, Nicaragua requires RealAudio
 Photo gallery of Ben Linder as a unicyclist
 Casa Ben Linder, is a meeting place and has served as an "incubator" for solidarity organizations in Nicaragua
 Ben Linder info at Marc Becker's website
 The Linder House Co-op at the University of Michigan.
 Film by Jason Blalock.  Interviews with Ben Linder's American and Nicaraguan coworkers 20 years later
  El Payaso, obra de teatro de Emilio Rodríguez, dirigido por Georgina Escobar, presentado at Teatro Milagro, Portland Guía de estudio
  El Payaso, by Emilio Rodríguez, directed by Georgina Escobar, at Teatro Milagro, Portland. English Press Release

Central America solidarity activists
People of the Nicaraguan Revolution
Contras
University of Washington College of Engineering alumni
People from Portland, Oregon
20th-century American Jews
American terrorism victims
Assassinated American activists
American people murdered abroad
Terrorism deaths in Nicaragua
People murdered in Nicaragua
1987 crimes in Nicaragua
1987 murders in North America
1980s murders in Nicaragua
1987 deaths
1959 births